Antaeotricha basirubrella is a moth in the family Depressariidae. It was described by Francis Walker in 1864. It is found in Amazonas, Brazil.

Adults are brown, the forewings reddish ferruginous for one-third of the length from the base, this hue bounded by an angular transverse whitish line. There is a slightly curved transverse submarginal whitish line, the space between the two lines irregularly whitish speckled. The marginal points are whitish and diffuse.

References

Moths described in 1864
basirubrella
Moths of South America